Casey Webb is an American television host and professional eater. He is best known as the host of the television series Man v. Food.

Early life
Webb was born in New York State, and worked as a child model during his youth. He grew up in Little Silver, New Jersey and attended Red Bank Regional High School, where he played for the school's football team and competed on the school's wrestling team.

Career
Webb's first job in the restaurant industry as a dishwasher at Danny’s Pizzeria along the Jersey Shore, and eventually rose to the role of restaurant manager and has also worked as a bartender. At the same time, he pursued an acting career, with appearances in the television series Inside Amy Schumer, Boardwalk Empire, and Part Timers. In 2017 he became the new host of the television series Man v. Food, in which Casey attempts to consume large dishes in a competition style at various restaurants across the United States-- he has referred to the challenges as a "sport". He remained host of the series when it made the move from the Travel Channel to the Cooking Channel. Webb's run with the series has also been aired on the Food Network. In his second season with the series, Fox News called him "TV's monumental eater". In addition to his own show, he has also appeared on the series Beat Bobby Flay and Santa's Baking Blizzard.

References

Living people
American television hosts
21st-century American male actors
Food Network chefs
People from Little Silver, New Jersey
Red Bank Regional High School alumni
American food industry businesspeople